Manuel Blum (born 26 April 1938) is a Venezuelan-American computer scientist who received the Turing Award in 1995 "In recognition of his contributions to the foundations of computational complexity theory and its application to cryptography and program checking".

Education
Blum was born to a Jewish family in Venezuela. Blum was educated at MIT, where he received his bachelor's degree and his master's degree in electrical engineering in 1959 and 1961 respectively, and his Ph.D. in mathematics in 1964 supervised by Marvin Minsky.

Career
Blum worked as a professor of computer science at the University of California, Berkeley until 2001. From 2001 to 2018, he was the Bruce Nelson Professor of Computer Science at Carnegie Mellon University, where his wife, Lenore Blum, was also a professor of Computer Science.

In 2002, he was elected to the United States National Academy of Sciences. In 2006, he was elected a member of the National Academy of Engineering for contributions to abstract complexity theory, inductive inference, cryptographic protocols, and the theory and applications of program checkers.

In 2018 he and his wife Lenore resigned from Carnegie Mellon University to protest against sexism after a change in management structure of Project Olympus led to sexist treatment of her as director and the exclusion of other women from project activities.

Research

In the 60s he developed an axiomatic complexity theory which was independent of concrete machine models. The theory is based on Gödel numberings and the Blum axioms. Even though the theory is not based on any machine model it yields concrete results like the compression theorem, the gap theorem, the honesty theorem and the Blum speedup theorem.

Some of his other work includes a protocol for flipping a coin over a telephone, median of medians (a linear time selection algorithm), the Blum Blum Shub pseudorandom number generator, the Blum–Goldwasser cryptosystem, and more recently CAPTCHAs.

Blum is also known as the advisor of many prominent researchers. Among his Ph.D. students are Leonard Adleman, Dana Angluin, Shafi Goldwasser, Mor Harchol-Balter, Russell Impagliazzo, Silvio Micali, Gary Miller, Moni Naor, Steven Rudich, Michael Sipser, Ronitt Rubinfeld, Umesh Vazirani, Vijay Vazirani, Luis von Ahn, and Ryan Williams.

See also 
List of Venezuelans
Graph isomorphism problem
Non-interactive zero-knowledge proof
Quantum coin flipping
Pancake sorting

References

American computer scientists
Theoretical computer scientists
1938 births
Living people
Jewish American scientists
International Association for Cryptologic Research fellows
Members of the United States National Academy of Engineering
Members of the United States National Academy of Sciences
Turing Award laureates
Carnegie Mellon University faculty
UC Berkeley College of Engineering faculty
Venezuelan emigrants to the United States
Venezuelan Jews
Massachusetts Institute of Technology School of Science alumni
20th-century American engineers
21st-century American engineers
20th-century American scientists
21st-century American scientists
MIT School of Engineering alumni